The Journal of Propulsion and Power is a bimonthly peer-reviewed scientific journal covering research on aerospace propulsion and power. The editor-in-chief is Joseph M. Powers (University of Notre Dame). It is published by the American Institute of Aeronautics and Astronautics and was established in 1985.

Abstracting and indexing
The journal is abstracted and indexed in:

According to the Journal Citation Reports, the journal has a 2018 impact factor of 1.362.

See also

References

External links

English-language journals
Engineering journals
Publications established in 1985
Bimonthly journals
Academic journals published by learned and professional societies